In Canadian politics, a leadership review is a vote held at a political party convention in which delegates decide whether to endorse the incumbent party leader or schedule a leadership convention to elect a new leader. In most parties at present, such a vote is required at the first convention following a general election. While a leadership election is only required if the incumbent leader fails to receive support from a simple majority of delegates (or if a motion to hold a leadership election passes by one vote), in practice leaders who do not win the review by a substantial margin are expected to either call a leadership election and re-offer or resign altogether. The term also refers to reviews under the Reform Act, in which the party caucuses in the House of Commons decide on whether to retain the leader.

Traditionally in most Canadian political parties, there was no mechanism for a political party to forcibly remove an incumbent leader. This changed in the late 1960s as a result of a grassroots revolt within the Progressive Conservative Party of Canada against the leadership of John G. Diefenbaker after leading the party to two successive electoral defeats. Party president Dalton Camp agitated for the right of the party to hold a leadership review. Camp called for such a review and, in 1966, ran for re-election as party president declaring that if he was returned to the position, he would call a leadership convention for 1967. He won an important endorsement from Allan S. Blott, the President of Saskatchewan's Progressive Conservative Student Federation, the core of Diefenbaker's political base. At the time, Blott was married to Catherine "Kit" Sampson, the Progressive Conservative Party of Canada's National Youth Director. With strong youth support, Camp was handily re-elected and the party passed a motion to hold a leadership convention by the end of 1967. In January 1967, Diefenbaker asked the party executive to call a leadership convention "at the earliest possible date". Diefenbaker stood as a candidate in the September 1967 convention and was defeated by Robert Stanfield. Subsequently, the Progressive Conservatives instituted a constitutional requirement that a leadership review be held at every party convention.

In January 1983, Progressive Conservative leader Joe Clark voluntarily called the leadership election for later that year after winning the support of only 66.9% of delegates at a leadership review. He ran in the election but was defeated by Brian Mulroney. Subsequently, the party altered its rules so that a mandatory leadership review would only occur at the first convention following a general election rather than at every convention. Since 1983, 66% has been considered an informal benchmark for leaders to surpass in order to avoid calling a leadership election.

The Liberal Party of Canada adopted a similar leadership review mechanism.

The New Democratic Party had used a system in which the leader ran for re-election at every convention however, no federal NDP leader had ever faced a serious challenge under this system which usually resulted in the incumbent leader being acclaimed. After instituting a one member, one vote leadership election system in 2003, the NDP also adopted the leadership review mechanism used by other parties. At such a vote held on April 10, 2016 at the NDP's federal convention held in Edmonton, Alberta, incumbent leader Thomas Mulcair lost a leadership review vote when only 48% of delegates supported his continued leadership.

Provincial political parties also use leadership reviews. The 2006 Manitoba Progressive Conservative leadership election was called by party leader Stuart Murray after he received only 55% support in a leadership review. In 2006, Alberta Progressive Conservative Premier Ralph Klein agreed to step down as party leader that year after he received the endorsement of only 55% of delegates in a leadership review.

In early 2022, a Reform Act leadership review resulted in the Conservative caucus ousting Erin O'Toole as leader of the party.

Albertan Premier, Jason Kenney (2017-2022), narrowly obtained a majority of the votes in a leadership review with just over 51% endorsing him, but Kenney resigned in the face of a divided party. This triggered the 2022 United Conservative Party leadership election.

See also
 Leadership spill, a similar practice in Australian politics

References

Political terminology in Canada

1966 introductions